Brassica rupestris is a species of flowering plant in the family Brassicaceae, native to southwestern Italy, and Sicily. The plant is known to grow on vertical limestone cliffs. In the past it was proposed, based on morphology, that Brassica rupestris contributed to the ancestry of either kale or kohlrabi, but DNA evidence shows that it did not.

Taxonomy
Brassica rupestris was described and named by Constantine Samuel Rafinesque in 1810. In 1997 Francesco Raimondo and Pietro Mazzola erected a subspecies, Brassica rupestris subsp. hispida, based on very slight differences including leaf hairiness and silique size, which is not supported by molecular studies.

Subtaxa
The following subtaxa are currently accepted:
Brassica rupestris subsp. hispida  – Sicily
Brassica rupestris subsp. rupestris – southwestern Italy, Sicily

Chemistry
There were a number of substances of note found in the roots and shoots of B.rupestris. These were tartaric acid ester, reduced glutathione (GSH), ascorbic acid, dehydroascorbic acid, glucobrassicin, and glucoraphanin.

Distribution and habitat
Brassica rupestris subsp. rupestris is found in mountainous areas of Calabria and Sicily, and has been reassessed as Least Concern, while B.rupestris subsp. hispida is found in a number of stations in Sicily and has been reassessed as Vulnerable.

References

rupestris
Flora of Italy
Flora of Sicily
Plants described in 1810